This is a list of singles which topped the Irish Singles Chart in 1966.

Note that prior to 1992, the Irish singles chart was compiled from trade shipments from the labels to record stores, rather than on consumer sales.

See also
1966 in music
Irish Singles Chart
List of artists who reached number one in Ireland

1966 in Irish music
1966 record charts
1966